A frame line is the unused space that separates two adjacent images, or film frames, on the release print of a motion picture. When a film is properly projected, the frame lines should not be visible to the audience and are typically cropped out in projection with an aperture mask.

See also
Letterbox

Film and video technology
Film and video terminology